Justin Johan Basson (born 10 February 1994) is a South African rugby union player for the  in the United Rugby Championship. His regular position is lock.

Career

Blue Bulls

Basson was born in Cape Town. After high school, he joined the Blue Bulls Academy prior to the 2013 season. He was one of the first-choice locks for the  side during the 2013 Under-19 Provincial Championship; after two appearances off the bench in their first two matches of the season, he started every other match, helping the Blue Bulls finish top of the log to qualify for the title play-offs.

He was named in a 74-man South Africa Under-20 training squad named in February 2014. However, he did not make the final squad that participated at the 2014 IRB Junior World Championship in New Zealand.

Free State Cheetahs

He started nine of the  side's thirteen matches during the 2014 Under-21 Provincial Championship and played off the bench on one occasion.

He was included in a  that participated in the 2015 Vodacom Cup. He made his first class debut by starting their second match of the season against  in a 52–15 victory.

Notes

References

South African rugby union players
Living people
1994 births
Rugby union players from Cape Town
Rugby union locks
Free State Cheetahs players
Cheetahs (rugby union) players
Western Province (rugby union) players
Stormers players
Rugby ATL players
Sharks (rugby union) players